Alfie is a 2004 romantic comedy-drama film inspired by the 1966 British film of the same name and its 1975 sequel, starring Jude Law as the title character, originally played by Michael Caine in the 1966 film and Alan Price in the 1975 sequel. The film was co-written, directed, and produced by Charles Shyer.

Plot
Alfie Elkins is a Cockney limo driver in Manhattan. A sex addict, he regularly beds women on one-night stands. In addition, he maintains a casual relationship with single mother Julie, his "semi-regular-quasi-sort-of-girlfriend thing", and unhappily married Dorie. Once Dorie wants more than casual sex, he stops calling.

Alfie and his coworker and best friend Marlon want to open a company together, but Marlon needs to get back with his ex, Lonette. When Alfie goes to put in a good word for him, he finds her at her bar. But after getting drunk, they have sex. Alfie meets Marlon the next day, terrified he knows about it, but is relieved when Marlon says he and Lonette got back together and are getting married.

When Alfie goes to Julie's for a booty call, she throws him out, confronting him as she had discovered Dorie's panties in her rubbish bin—he had discarded them after finding them in his pocket. Intending to reconcile with her at her son's birthday, Alfie sees Julie has returned to her estranged husband. He later discovers Lonette is pregnant with his child, and (without telling Marlon) they go to a clinic for an abortion. Soon afterward, Marlon and Lonette unexpectedly move upstate, without saying goodbye.

Following repeated failures to achieve an erection, Alfie sees a doctor, who tells him he is perfectly healthy, and his impotence is due to stress. However, he finds a lump on Alfie's penis. They immediately run a test at the clinic and he spends a few anxious days awaiting the results. On a trip to the hospital, Alfie meets Joe, a widower, in the bathroom. Joe gives life advice to the depressed Alfie: "Find somebody to love, and live every day like it's your last". Soon afterward, Alfie finds out he's cancer-free.

Believing he's been given a second chance, Alfie decides to "aim higher" in his love life. He meets Nikki, a beautiful but unstable woman, and they quickly embark on a passionate, turbulent relationship. Moving in together, Alfie finds it hard to put up with her mood swings, especially after she goes off her medication. Distancing himself, he focuses on an older woman, Liz. A sultry cosmetics mogul, she inspires him to "aim higher". He becomes infatuated, but she wants to keep it strictly sexual. Alfie then ends it with Nikki.

Running into Julie in a coffee shop, Alfie realizes he has feelings for her; however, she's now with someone else. On a trip upstate to visit Marlon and his now-wife, Lonette, she reveals she never had the abortion, and, Marlon knows Alfie is the father, but nonetheless decided to stay. Upon seeing Marlon with hurt in his eyes, Alfie visits Joe, who tells him to get his life together. Alfie turns to Liz for comfort but is crushed that she has an even younger man in her life.

Alfie has a chance meeting with Dorie late one night. As he tries to get back into her life, she wants no part of him. Apologizing for not calling, he admits he has trouble expressing himself, running from relationships when they become too serious. She wishes him luck. The film ends with Alfie talking about genuinely changing his ways.

Cast

A black and white photograph of Michael Caine representing Alfie Elkins Sr. appears during the film's credits.

Production

The film was shot throughout England, mostly locations doubling for New York City, along with on-set shooting in Manhattan.
 Liverpool, England
 Manchester, England
 Port of Tilbury, England (some dock scenes)
 Park Avenue, Manhattan, New York City, US
 Waldorf-Astoria Hotel, Manhattan, New York City, US

Music

The music score was composed by Mick Jagger, Dave Stewart and John Powell, featuring 13 original songs and a remake of the original 1966 title song. Further songs are by Wyclef Jean and The Isley Brothers.

For the song "Old Habits Die Hard", Jagger and Stewart won the BFCA Award, the Golden Globe, a Sierra Award and the World Soundtrack Award.

Reception

Box office
Alfie grossed $13,399,812 in the US and $21,750,734 in other countries for a worldwide total of $35,150,546 on a $60 million budget. The film opened on November 5, 2004 in the United States and grossed $2,206,738 on the first day. That weekend, the film was #5 in the box office with $6,218,335 behind The Incredibles opening weekend, Rays second, The Grudges third, and Saws second. When compared to its $60 million budget, Alfie was a box office bomb.

Critical reception
Alfie received mixed reviews. Based on 155 reviews collected by the film review aggregator Rotten Tomatoes, 48% of critics gave Alfie a positive review, with an average rating of 5.6/10. The site's consensus states: "This unnecessary remake wants Alfie to have his cake and eat it, too, but a lack of sexual fizz and a sour performance by Jude Law conspire to deliver audiences a romantic comedy that isn't romantic or funny."

Todd McCarthy from Variety  describes the film as  "a breezy, sexy romp with a conscience that reflects in obvious but interesting ways on societal changes over the intervening 38 years."

Roger Ebert enjoyed the film, praising Law's performance and saying that "on its own terms, it's funny at times and finally sad and sweet."

Entertainment Weekly gave the film a "B−", praising the actresses and Law, but also noting "Jude Law would appear to have all the attributes of a movie star: looks, humor, rogue charm. Yet there's one he could use more of — an anger that might ignite his smooth presence."

Manohla Dargis of The New York Times states:

Unlike the 1966 British film on which it is based, with its abrasive star-making turn from Michael Caine, the new Alfie doesn't chase social significance - it just wants us to have a good time. The story's observations about male behavior aren't earth shattering...but what gives it its kick is how Alfie takes the film audience into his confidence. In both films, the character talks directly into the camera, a disarming strategy that brings us closer to this serial seducer than we might want. Playing narrator turns Alfie into a tour guide and something of his own defense attorney; it also means he has to enrapture the audience along with his conquests.

References

 Original Literary Source: Bill Naughton, Alfie, (London, UK),

External links

 
 
 
 
 

2004 films
2004 romantic comedy-drama films
2000s English-language films
2000s sex comedy films
American films based on plays
American remakes of British films
American romantic comedy-drama films
American sex comedy films
British films based on plays
British romantic comedy-drama films
British sex comedy films
Casual sex in films
Films about abortion
Films about adultery in the United States
Films about narcissism
Films directed by Charles Shyer
Films scored by John Powell
Films set in New York City
Films shot at Pinewood Studios
Films shot in Essex
Films shot in Greater Manchester
Films shot in Merseyside
Films shot in New York City
Films with screenplays by Charles Shyer
Paramount Pictures films
2000s American films
2000s British films